Cranbury is a neighborhood or section in the northeast corner of the city of Norwalk in Fairfield County, Connecticut,  United States.

The Save Cranbury Association, a local community group, describes itself as an "association of citizens dedicated to the preservation of the historical, rural quality of Cranbury area of Norwalk".



Cranbury Park

Dog walking and frisbee playing is popular in the park (there is a full frisbee golf course), and there is a children's playground. The park also features many trails.

The property had been the estate of Edward B. Gallaher, owner (since 1917)() of the Clover Manufacturing Company on Main Avenue, which made industrial abrasives such as sandpaper. He began buying the land, which was previously farmland owned by different families, in the 1919s.)) After Gallaher's death, the property was left to his alma mater, Stevens Institute of Technology in Hoboken, New Jersey, which continued to own it while Gallaher's wife lived there. After she died, the institute sold it to the city in 1965. The Gallaher mansion, still on the property, is a 20-room, Tudor Revival-style English fieldstone manor house built in 1930 or 1931 (ref May 5, 2010 Connecticut State Register of Historic Places, Hartford 468=bot/>). The mansion, which is now used for community meetings and weddings, has oak paneling, French doors and stained glass windows.

In May 2006 the city Recreation and Parks Committee held a public hearing on proposed rules to restrict unleashed dogs to the orchard area of the park. The hearing drew strong opposition and the proposal was tabled. Spurred initially by the leash controversy, Friends of Cranbury Park formed that month both to support keeping many areas open to unleashed dogs and to improve the park in general. In July 2006 the group planted more than 50 perennials, including butterfly and Rose-of-Sharon bushes, to create a butterfly garden in the park.

A new entrance and exit to the park, lined with daffodils planted by volunteers the previous October, were opened in May 2007. Near the new front gates, the city plans to make a partially refurbished pump house into an information center where a person will be assigned to track visitors and alert them to park regulations. One of the former entrances to the park, on Grumman Avenue, will become an exit, according to city officials. The Kensett Avenue entrance was to be closed and only used for emergencies or large events. Officials of the city Parks and Recreation Department said in early 2007 that it plans to restore the estate's formal gardens and small,  tea house.

In 2008, Friends of Cranbury Park and the city Recreation and Parks Department announced classes would be offered at the park on such subjects as dog obedience, Frisbee, yoga, tai chi, watercolor painting and photography.

White Barn Theatre

The late actress Lucille Lortel founded The White Barn Theatre in 1947 on her  estate at the corner of Cranbury Road and Newtown Avenue.

With the theater, created from an old horse barn on the estate, Lortel aimed to present unusual and experimental plays, promote new playwrights, composers, actors, directors and designers, and help established artists develop new directions in ways they might not have been able to do in commercial theater.

Plays by numerous well-known dramatists started at the 148-seat theater (some of which went on to commercial success elsewhere). Among the playwrights who premiered works at the theater were Seán O'Casey, Eugène Ionesco, Edward Albee, Samuel Beckett, Terrence McNally and Lanford Wilson. Actors Milo O'Shea and Eileen Heckart trod the boards at the theater.

On September 26, 1992 the White Barn Theatre Museum was set up by expanding and renovating a former small storage area off of the theater.

Lortel bequeathed the property to her theater foundation, which later proposed putting a housing development and possibly a school on the site, something opposed by members of the Save Cranbury Association.

The Connecticut Friends School, which bought the property and received zoning approval to construct a new school building on it, planned (as of the summer of 2007) to keep and renovate the theater.

Connecticut Friends School

In July 2007 the Connecticut Friends School (CFS) of neighboring Wilton, Connecticut received zoning approval to build a new school on the site of the White Barn Theatre and Lucille Lortell's estate. as of late July, the school needed a building permit in order to proceed.

The school would be  in size and would have a "vegetative roof", solar panels, and be built around a hill, which was expected to decrease heating and cooling costs. A co-director of the Save Cranbury Association, created by area residents who were concerned about potential use of the property, told the city Zoning Commission in 2007 that she supported the school's move. The building would cover 3.09 percent of the property, although zoning in the AA residence zone it is located in allows for 25 percent coverage. Only four or five schools in the city have as much land as the school.

The school is designed to serve a maximum of 125 students, and the traffic analysis, septic system and space for parking are all planned with that level of enrollment in mind. As of 2007, the school provided one small bus for students.

References

Geography of Norwalk, Connecticut
Neighborhoods in Connecticut